Charles Lindsay Orr-Ewing (8 September 1860 – 24 December 1903) was a Scottish Tory politician.
 
The youngest son of Sir Archibald Orr-Ewing and Elizabeth Lindsay Reid; he was educated at Harrow School. After travel in the East, he was commissioned as a captain in the 3rd Argyll and Sutherland Highlanders. He was Member of Parliament for Ayr Burghs from 1895, until he died of heart failure in 1903 aged 43.

References

External links 
 The peerage: http://www.thepeerage.com/p3338.htm#i33372
 Second marriage announcement: http://paperspast.natlib.govt.nz/cgi-bin/paperspast?a=d&d=CHP18980611.2.33
 

1860 births
1903 deaths
Scottish Tory MPs (pre-1912)
People educated at Harrow School
Argyll and Sutherland Highlanders officers
UK MPs 1895–1900
UK MPs 1900–1906
Younger sons of baronets
Members of the Parliament of the United Kingdom for Scottish constituencies